Chromium(IV) fluoride is an inorganic compound with the chemical formula CrF4. It has a dark greenish-black color when solid. It rapidly hydrolysizes in presence of moisture in air or directly in water.

Synthesis
Powdered chromium or CrCl3 is exposed to fluorine gas at a temperature of 350-500 °C, which creates a mix of CrF4 and CrF5. The CrF4 settles out as varnish-like brown beads upon cooling.

Reactions
Chromium(IV) fluoride will react with water:

CrF4 + 2H2O -> CrO2 + 4HF

References

Chromium–halogen compounds
Fluorides
Fluorine compounds
Metal halides
Chromium(IV) compounds